Arsen Julfalakyan (born 8 May 1987) Ph.D., is an Armenian Greco-Roman style wrestler, Olympic silver medalist, World and European Champion, World Cup winner and three-time Olympian.

Early life
Julfalakyan was born in the city of Leninakan (now Gyumri), Armenia. He is the son of renowned European, World and Olympic Champion, Armenian national Greco-Roman wrestling team head coach Levon Julfalakyan. Under the guidance of his father, Arsen began wrestling at age 11.

Career
In the years 2001, 2003, and 2004, Julfalakyan won the Junior Armenian Championship, and won the Cadet European Championships in 2003 and 2004 and the Junior World Championships in 2007.

Arsen, age 21, competed at the 2008 Summer Olympics. He was eliminated in his second match, coming in tenth place.

Julfalakyan was a member of the Armenian Greco-Roman wrestling team at the 2009 Wrestling World Cup. The Armenian team came in third place. Julfalakyan personally won a bronze medal.

Julfalakyan won the gold medal at the 2009 European Wrestling Championships in Vilnius and the silver medal in the 2010 World Wrestling Championships in Moscow.

Julfalakyan was a member of the Armenian Greco-Roman wrestling team at the 2010 Wrestling World Cup. The Armenian team came in third place. Julfalakyan personally won a gold medal.

Arsen made his Olympic return at the 2012 Summer Olympics. He advanced to the finals without losing a single point, but faced defeat in the finals against Roman Vlasov in a tensely contested match. Vlasov called Julfalakyan his idol afterwards. Julfalakyan won an Olympic silver medal, the first Olympic silver medal won by an Armenian representative in sixteen-years. At the closing ceremony, Julfalakyan was the flag bearer of Armenia. Julfalakyan was voted the Armenian Athlete of the Year for 2012.

Julfalakyan won the gold medal at the 2014 World Wrestling Championships, the first for Armenia in Greco-Roman wrestling in 13 years. In the 2014 Grapple at the Garden in New York City, Julfalakyan defeated 4-time NCAA champion Kyle Dake in a Greco-Roman match. He won the "Dan Kolov and Nikola Petrov" international tournament in Sofia on 24 April and dedicated his victory to the victims of the Armenian genocide on the 100th anniversary, wearing a shirt commemorating the 1.5 million victims during the medal presentation.

He competed at the 2016 Summer Olympics but lost in the first round and didn't move onto the repechage.

Personal life
Julfalakyan got married on 27 August 2012 in the St. Gevorg Church in Mughni.

Arsen studied at Yerevan State University and received an International Relations faculty master's degree and PhD in History.

In 2021 Arsen Julfalakyan was elected as a Chairman of the United World Wrestling Athletes’ Commission. He serves also as UWW Bureau Member. The Athletes' Commission was established in 2013 with the role of protecting the rights and interests of all United World Wrestling Olympic style athletes. The Athletes' Commission members reach out and communicate with active athletes as peers to collect feedback.

Awards
Julfalakyan was awarded the "For Merit" 2nd degree medal in 2012 and the "For Service to Fatherland" 1st degree medal in 2014.

References

External links
 
 The-Sports.org
 

1987 births
Living people
Sportspeople from Gyumri
Yerevan State University alumni
Armenian male sport wrestlers
Olympic wrestlers of Armenia
Wrestlers at the 2008 Summer Olympics
Wrestlers at the 2012 Summer Olympics
Wrestlers at the 2016 Summer Olympics
Olympic silver medalists for Armenia
Olympic medalists in wrestling
Medalists at the 2012 Summer Olympics
World Wrestling Championships medalists
Universiade medalists in wrestling
Universiade bronze medalists for Armenia
European Wrestling Championships medalists
Medalists at the 2013 Summer Universiade
Ethnic Armenian sportspeople